The Juniper Tree can refer to:

 The Juniper Tree (fairy tale), a fairy tale by the Brothers Grimm
 The Juniper Tree (film), a 1990 film starring Björk
 The Juniper Tree (opera), a 1985 opera composed by Philip Glass and Robert Moran
 The Juniper Tree, a 1997 opera by Roderick Watkins (music) and Patricia Debney (libretto)
 The Juniper Tree (novel), a novel by Barbara Comyns Carr (1985)
 The Juniper Tree, an opera by Joshua Ollswang
 "The Juniper Tree", a 2000 short science fiction story by John Kessel
Juniper, a plant in the genus Juniperus

See also 
 Juniper (disambiguation)